Cliff's Amusement Park (previously known as Uncle Cliff's Amusement Park prior to 1991) is a combination amusement park and water park in Albuquerque, New Mexico, United States. It opened in 1959. It features 24 rides for all ages, food, and carnival style games. It also features a water attraction, WaterMania!, which operates Memorial Day weekend through Labor Day weekend. It also has the only wooden-hybrid roller coaster in New Mexico, the final coaster designed by Custom Coasters International, called the New Mexico Rattler.

Early beginnings (1959–1962) 
Cliff and Zella Hammond built a small kiddie park located at 7600 Lomas Blvd in 1959 and named it Uncle Cliff’s Kiddieland. After a few years at this location, the neighbors started a petition to have the park shut down. They relocated for a very short time to Little Beavertown in Tijeras Canyon outside Albuquerque.

Evolution (1963 – present) 
In 1963, Cliff's relocated to its present location at 4800 Osuna Rd. NE. At that time it was on the very outskirts of Albuquerque. As bigger attractions were being built the company wanted to take the emphasis from the word "Kiddie" and dropped it and renamed the park Cliff's Amusement Park.

Rides

Roller coasters

Water rides

Thrill rides

Family rides

Kiddy rides

References

External links 
 

Amusement parks in New Mexico
1959 establishments in New Mexico
Buildings and structures in Albuquerque, New Mexico
Tourist attractions in Albuquerque, New Mexico
Amusement parks opened in 1959